Dorcadion seguntianum is a species of beetle in the family Cerambycidae. It was described by K. Daniel and J. Daniel in 1899. It is known from Spain.

Varietas
 Dorcadion seguntianum var. moncayoensis Nicolas, 1909
 Dorcadion seguntianum var. ruspolii Breuning, 1974
 Dorcadion seguntianum var. superlineatum Lauffer, 1911

See also 
Dorcadion

References

seguntianum
Beetles described in 1899